Elections to Tendring District Council in Essex, England took place on 6 May 1999. This was on the same day as other local elections across the United Kingdom. Although the Labour Party remained the largest party on the council, it lost overall control while the Conservatives made major gains.

Summary Result

Ward results

Alresford & Thorrington

Ardleigh

Beaumont & Thorpe

Bockings Elm

Bradfield, Wrabness & Wix

Brightlingsea East

Brightlingsea West

Elmstead

Frinton

Golf Green

Great & Little Oakley

Great Bentley

Great Bromley & Little Bromley

Harwich East

Harwich East Central

Harwich West

Harwich West Central

Haven

Holland & Kirby

Lawford & Manningtree

Little Clacton

Mistley

Ramsey & Parkeston

Rush Green

Southcliff

St. Bartholomew's

St. James

St. John's

St. Mary's

St. Osyth & Point Clear

Tendring & Weeley

Walton

References

1999
Tendring District Council election